Petar Kolev (born 25 November 1974) is a former Bulgarian football defender and current manager.

External links
 Profile at BulgarianPlayers.com

1974 births
Living people
Bulgarian footballers
Bulgaria under-21 international footballers
First Professional Football League (Bulgaria) players
FC Lokomotiv Gorna Oryahovitsa players
PFC Velbazhd Kyustendil players
PFC Lokomotiv Plovdiv players
PFC Rodopa Smolyan players
PFC Beroe Stara Zagora players
Association football defenders
People from Haskovo
Sportspeople from Haskovo Province